The 2011 AFC U-16 Women's Championship qualification was qualification section of 2011 AFC U-16 Women's Championship. It was held from October 10 to December 12, 2010.

First qualification round

Group A

Group B

 Bahrain and Uzbekistan withdrew from 2011 AFC U16 qualification.

Note: Since Jordan and Iran tied in points, goal differences, number of goals and the head-to-head result, a penalty shootout was held after the 90 minutes match to determine the group winner, in which Iran won and advanced to the second round.

Second qualification round
 All matches in Bangkok, Thailand.
 Times listed are UTC+7.

Thailand is ranked ahead of Myanmar based on head-to-head result

Qualified teams

Automatically qualified

Qualified via competition

2011
2010 in Asian football
2010 in women's association football
2010 in youth sport